Enterprise Group is a pioneering Ghanaian insurance company. They are listed on the stock index of the Ghana Stock Exchange, the GSE All-Share Index. It has been in operation since 1924, when Ghana was the British Gold Coast, under the name Enterprise Insurance Company.

External links
Ghana Business Index

Insurance companies of Ghana
Companies based in Accra
Financial services companies established in 1924
1924 establishments in Gold Coast (British colony)
Companies listed on the Ghana Stock Exchange